Sebi may refer to:

People
 Dr. Sebi or Alfredo Bowman, Honduran self-proclaimed herbalist and healer
 Sebi Tramontana (born 1960), jazz trombonist

Places
 Sebi, Zaveh, Iran

Other
 Sebi (song)
 Securities and Exchange Board of India